The women's 10,000 metres at the 1998 European Athletics Championships was held at the Népstadion on 19 August.

Medalists

Results

Final

References

Results
Results
Results

10000
10,000 metres at the European Athletics Championships
Marathons in Hungary
1998 in women's athletics